Albert B. Elmore (November 19, 1904 – July 26, 1988) was an American college football coach and player, college basketball coach, and college athletics administrator. A graduate of the University of Alabama, Elmore led the Troy State Teachers College (now known as Troy University) from 1931 to 1936, compiling a 31–20–2 record. He also coached basketball at the Virginia Military Institute for one season in the late 1930s.

Coaching career
Following his graduation from University of Alabama, Elmore began coaching in 1931 at the Troy State Teachers College. He is credited with changing the team mascot to "Red Wave" (this was a variation of Alabama's "Crimson Tide", and the current nickname is "Trojans"). In seven years at Troy State, five of which were winning seasons, Elmore compiled a 35–30–3 record.

Elmore then left for the Virginia Military Institute (VMI) in Lexington, Virginia, where headed the school's freshman football team as well as the basketball team in the 1937–38 season. The Keydets were 4–11 in Elmore's lone season at the institute.

Personal life
Elmore was born on November 19, 1904, in Reform, Alabama, to his father Silvanus and Ann Elmore. He grew up with eight brothers and two sisters. Elmore died on July 26, 1998, in Troy.

Head coaching record

Football

Basketball

See also
 Alabama Crimson Tide football yearly statistical leaders

References

External links
 

1904 births
1998 deaths
American football ends
Alabama Crimson Tide football players
Troy Trojans athletic directors
Troy Trojans football coaches
VMI Keydets basketball coaches
VMI Keydets football coaches
People from Reform, Alabama
People from Troy, Alabama
Coaches of American football from Alabama
Players of American football from Alabama
Basketball coaches from Alabama